Tommaso Bernardo Gaffi (14 December 1667 - Rome, 11 February 1744) was an Italian baroque composer. He was a pupil of Bernardo Pasquini, organist of the church of Santa Maria Maggiore, where Gaffi succeeded him in 1704. As Pasquini he enjoyed the patronage of cardinals Benedetto Pamphili and Pietro Ottoboni, as well as Prince Francesco Maria Ruspoli. His own students included Girolamo Chiti and Andrea Basili.

Works, editions and recordings
  (1700)
 La Micole (Modena, 1689)
 Abigaille (with F. Bambini - Modena, 1689)
 La forza del divino amore (Rome, 1691); recording 2004
 Adam (Latin, with F. Ciampelletti - Rome, 1692), lost
 Sant'Eugenia (Florence, 1693), lost
 L'Innocenza gloriosa (Florence, 1693)
 Il sacrificio del Verbo umano (Rome, 1700)

References

17th-century Italian composers
18th-century Italian composers
Italian male composers
1667 births
1744 deaths
17th-century male musicians